Jeff Pidgeon is an American animator, screenwriter, storyboard artist, and voice actor at Pixar.

Early life
Influenced by Charles M. Schulz's comic strip Peanuts, Jeff Pidgeon dreamed of becoming a newspaper cartoonist. He studied and graduated with a BFA degree from the California Institute of the Arts. He currently lives in Northern California.

Career
In 1991, he began working for Pixar Animation Studios, where he currently works as a writer, animator, and voice actor. He has worked behind the scenes on films such as FernGully: The Last Rainforest, Toy Story, A Bug's Life, Toy Story 2, Monsters, Inc. and WALL-E, as well as many US TV shows. He also provided the voice for the "Aliens" in the Toy Story films and the Toy Story Toons short, Hawaiian Vacation.

He is the designer of Hamton J. Pig in Tiny Toon Adventures.

Pidgeon has also manufactured his own toys.

Filmography

Production work
Turning Red (2022) - additional storyboard artist
Toy Story 4 (2019) - Story artist
Monsters University (2013) - Story artist
 Up (2009) - Story artist 
WALL-E (2008) - Story artist
Your Friend the Rat (2007) - Writer
Lifted (2006) - Story artist
Mike's New Car (2002) - Writer
Monsters, Inc. (2001) - Original Story, Story artist
Buzz Lightyear of Star Command (2000-2001) - Creative consultant
Toy Story 2 (1999) - Story artist, additional story material
A Bug's Life (1998) - additional storyboard artist
Toy Story (1995) - Animator, story artist
FernGully: The Last Rainforest (1992) - Additional character designer
Taz-Mania (1991) - Animation layout artist, concept artist
The Simpsons (1990-1991) - Character layout artist
Tiny Toon Adventures (1990-1991) - Model designer, character layout artist
Bart Simpson: Do the Bartman (1990) - Character layout artist
The Butter Battle Book (1989) - Concept artist
Hound Town (1989) - Character concept designer, layout artist
Christmas in Tattertown (1988) - Character designer, layout artist
Mighty Mouse: The New Adventures (1987-1988) -  Character designer

Voice acting
Dug Days (2021) (voice) - Fly
Forky Asks a Question (2020) (voice) - Mr. Spell
Toy Story 4 (2019) (voice) - Aliens
Kingdom Hearts III (2019) (voice) - Aliens
Disney Infinity: Marvel Super Heroes (2014) (video game) - Aliens
Disney Infinity (2013) (video game) - Aliens
Kinect: Disneyland Adventures (2011) (video game) - Aliens
Hawaiian Vacation (2011) - Aliens
Toy Story 3: The Video Game (2010) (video game) - Aliens
Toy Story 3 (2010) - Aliens
Toy Story Mania! (2009) (video game) - Aliens
Tracy (2009) - Justin Pooge
WALL-E (2008) - Additional Voices
Toy Story Midway Mania! (2008) - Aliens
The Incredibles (2004) - Additional Voices
Monsters, Inc (2001) - Bile
Toy Story Racer (2001) (video game) - Little Green Man
Buzz Lightyear of Star Command: The Adventure Begins (2000) - Aliens (Andy's room)
Toy Story 2 (1999) - Aliens
Toy Story Treats (1996) - Aliens
 Disney's Animated Storybook: Toy Story (1996) (video game) - Aliens
Toy Story (1995) - Aliens
A Story (1987) - Ted / The Goon Squad
Bring Me the Head of Charlie Brown (1986) - Great Pumpkin
Somewhere in the Arctic (1986) - Uhk

References

External links 

Living people
American male screenwriters
Animation screenwriters
American male voice actors
California Institute of the Arts alumni
Pixar people
Year of birth missing (living people)
Animators from Vermont